The Fly on the Wall Tour was a concert tour by Australian hard rock band AC/DC, in support of their tenth studio album Fly on the Wall, which was released on 28 June 1985.

Background
The tour was split into two legs, an American leg starting on 2 September 1985 in Binghamton, New York and a European leg ending on 16 February 1986 in Copenhagen, Denmark. The tour was marked by protests from some groups who claimed AC/DC's music was connected to the Night Stalker murders, which resulted in the Costa Mesa show on the North American leg being cancelled, after another murder was reported by a man wearing a hat with the band's name on it. Yngwie Malmsteen's Rising Force was the opening act on this tour.

Reception
Pete Bishop from the Pittsburgh Press who attended the Pittsburgh concert, opened his review with a headline, suggesting that the band could be losing their charge. He noted on the differences between the concert and the other in 1983, detailing that cannons were not fired before performing "For Those About to Rock (We Salute You)", nor did Angus moon the audience or ride on a roadie's shoulders through the audience - as well as noting the low attendance of 7,065 fans compared to the 12,284 fans that attended in 1983. He also criticized the vocals of Johnson, who said couldn't hit the highest note on "You Shook Me All Night Long". However, Bishop praised the band, noting that they radiated fun - adding that the band looked like they were having a good time on stage.

Jerry Spangler from the Deseret News, gave the Salt Lake City performance a positive review, opening that the band delivered a one-two punch alongside the opening act Yngwie Malmsteen. He praised Angus Young's performance, whom Spangler stated had delivered a first-class party-time rock show at ear-splitting decibels as the band performed new songs from the album Fly on the Wall. He noted on the audience who were dancing and cheering, stating that they were not disappointed - loving every minute of the energy-packed show. With the band starting off with a sizzling performance, Spangler also noted on the band milking the crowd for its worth, performing old and new songs to satisfy the metal-hungry crowd.

Setlist
"Fly on the Wall"
"Back in Black"
"Shake Your Foundations"
"Dirty Deeds Done Dirt Cheap"
"You Shook Me All Night Long"
"Sin City"
"Jailbreak"
"The Jack"
"Shoot to Thrill"
"Highway to Hell"
"Sink the Pink"
"Whole Lotta Rosie"
"Let There Be Rock"
Encore
"Hells Bells"
"T.N.T."
"For Those About to Rock (We Salute You)"

Tour dates

Cancelled dates

Box office score data

Personnel
Angus Young – lead guitar
Cliff Williams – bass guitar, backing vocals
Malcolm Young – rhythm guitar, backing vocals
Simon Wright – drums
Brian Johnson – lead vocals

References

Citations

Sources
 
 

AC/DC concert tours
1985 concert tours
1986 concert tours